Pyrota is a genus of blister beetles in the family Meloidae. There are at least 30 described species in Pyrota.

Species
These 31 species belong to the genus Pyrota:

 Pyrota akhurstiana Horn, 1891 i c g b
 Pyrota bilineata Horn, 1885 i c g b
 Pyrota centenaria Breyer & Trant, 1910 i c g b
 Pyrota concinna Casey, 1891 i c g b
 Pyrota deceptiva Selander, 1963 i c g b
 Pyrota discoidea LeConte, 1853 i c g b
 Pyrota engelmanni LeConte, 1847 i c g b
 Pyrota fasciata Selander, 1963 i c g b
 Pyrota hirticollis Champion, 1891 i c g
 Pyrota insulata (LeConte, 1858) i c g b (yellow-crescent blister beetle)
 Pyrota invita Horn, 1885 i c g b
 Pyrota lineata (Olivier, 1795) b
 Pyrota mariarum Champion, 1891 i c g
 Pyrota mutata b
 Pyrota mylabrina Chevrolat, 1834 i c g b
 Pyrota nigra Selander, 1983 i c g
 Pyrota nigrovittata b
 Pyrota nobilis (Haag-Rutenberg, 1880) i c g
 Pyrota obliquefascia Schaeffer, 1908 b
 Pyrota pacifica Selander, 1982 i c g
 Pyrota palpalis Champion, 1891 i c g b (Charlie Brown blister beetle)
 Pyrota perversa Dillon, 1952 i c g b
 Pyrota plagiata (Haag-Rutenberg, 1880) i c g b
 Pyrota postica LeConte, 1858 i c g b
 Pyrota punctata Casey, 1891 i c g b
 Pyrota quadrinervata (Herrera and Mendoza, 1866) i c g
 Pyrota rugulipennis Champion, 1891 i c g
 Pyrota sinuata (Olivier, 1795) i c g b
 Pyrota tenuicostatis (Dugès, 1869) i c g b (red-margined blister beetle)
 Pyrota terrestris Selander, 1963 i c g
 Pyrota trochanterica Horn, 1894 b
 Pyrota victoria Dillon, 1952 i c g

Data sources: i = ITIS, c = Catalogue of Life, g = GBIF, b = Bugguide.net

References

Further reading

External links

 

Meloidae
Articles created by Qbugbot